Lê Hồng Phong (6 September 1902 – 6 September 1942) was the second leader of the Communist Party of Vietnam (CPV); he led the party through the office of General Secretary of the Overseas Executive Committee of the Communist Party of Vietnam. The Overseas Executive Committee was the only body of the CPV left intact after increased repression by the French authorities in Indochina.

Early life
His real name is  Lê Huy Doãn born on September 6, 1902  to a poor family in Nghệ An. From his small life he has been struggling for many difficulties.  His relatives are Lê Huy Quán and Phạm Thị Sau

Orphaned from his father, but thanks to the frequency of the mother, he was allowed to learn Hán  in the village, the teacher was renamed Lê Văn Duyện. After that, he was given another 2 years of French. Due to his hardship, at 16, he applied to work as a salesman in Vinh to earn more money for his family. Some time later, he moved to Ben Thuy match factory workers and was dismissed for mobilizing workers to fight for exploitation rights with employers. From there, he entered the road as a professional revolutionary.

Overseas activities
In January 1924, he and 10 youths, including Phạm Văn Tích's fellow countrymen, went to Thailand, then crossed to Guangzhou, China. Here, he and Lê Hồng Sơn, Lê Quang Đạt  met Nguyễn Ái Quốc and was admitted to the revolutionary organization Tam Tam Commune (also known as Tan Viet Youth Union). He is one of nine nuclear members of the Viet Nam Youth Revolution Association.

In the summer of 1925, Lê Hồng Sơn and Lê Quang Đạt were introduced to the Hoàng Phố Military Academy. One year later, he was sent to study at the Guangzhou Air School. Here, in February 1926, introduced by Nguyễn Ái Quốc, he was admitted to the Communist Party of China. In August 1927, he and the Vietnamese volunteer youth group were studying at the Guangzhou Air Force School to study at the Soviet Air Force School.

However, thanks to good health, he was the only one in the group to continue studying at the Soviet Air Force School. From October 1926 to October 1927, he attended the Military Theory School in Leningrad (Soviet Union). From December 1927 to November 1928, he attended the 2nd Air Force Academy in Borisoglebsk (Soviet Union). From December 1928, he attended the Communist International University of the Communist International in Moscow (Soviet Union) with the alias Litvinov (Литвинов). After graduation, he joined the Red Army with the rank of Lieutenant Colonel.

Establishment of Overseas Commission
At the end of 1931, with the name of Vương Nhật Dân, he returned to China. At that time, in the country, communist organizations were strongly suppressed by the colonial government. In 1932, under the direction of the Communist International, he and some other comrades sought to contact the Party organization in the country to revive the movement and program the party's actions after the Party suffered heavy losses.

In June 1932, the Indochinese Communist Party issued the Communist International Action Program. Under the direction of the Communist International, in March 1934, in Macau, the Commander-in-Chief of the Indochinese Communist Party was established, in which he served as Secretary . As the situation of the Central Committee was almost paralyzed, the Overseas Command and the Interim Central Committee had the task of communicating between the Indochinese Communist Party and the Communist International and the parties. You reorganize the staff training for the country, publishes the Bolshevik Boom - the ruling body of the Party Central Committee, gathers and restores Party bases, prepares to convene the Party Congress Best.

From June 16 to 21, 1934, the Conference of the Commander-in-Chief of the Indochinese Communist Party and representatives of the Party organizations in the country were organized, including Lê Hồng Phong, Hà Huy Tập, Nguyễn Văn Dựt, Nguyễn Văn Tham and Trần Văn Chấn  . The conference adopted the Political Resolution and the Resolution on Organizational Matters.

Works from 1935 until his death

In March 1935, at the First Congress of the Party in Macau, Lê Hồng Phong was elected General Secretary. In July 1935, Lê Hồng Phong led the Party delegation to the International Congress in Moscow. The Congress recognized the Party as the official Communist Party and elected him a member of the Executive Committee of the Communist International. In January 1936, he went to China and convened the Central Party Congress in Shanghai In July 1936 . On November 10, 1937, he returned to Vietnam to work as La Anh. In March 1938, he attended the Central Conference in Hóc Môn , which decided to establish the "Indochinese Democratic Front". On June 22, 1939, he was arrested for the first time in Saigon and sentenced to 6 months imprisonment and expelled to his hometown of Nghệ An. On February 6, 1940, he was arrested for the second time, sentenced to five years in prison and exiled to Saigon and Côn Đảo. On September 6, 1942, he died while in prison in Côn Đảo on his 40th birthday.

See also
Lê Hồng Phong High School

References

Vietnamese communists
1902 births
1942 deaths
General Secretaries of the Central Committee of the Communist Party of Vietnam
Members of the 1st Central Committee of the Indochinese Communist Party
People from Nghệ An province
Communist University of the Toilers of the East alumni
Vietnamese people who died in prison custody
Prisoners who died in Vietnamese detention